Giuni Russo (born Giuseppa Romeo, 10 September 1951 – 14 September 2004) was an Italian singer-songwriter who specialised in experimental music after a short successful stint as an art-pop singer in the early 1980s. With her five-octaves range, she could produce extremely high notes and experimental sounds. She sang in Italian, English, French, German, Chinese, Spanish, Hebrew, Arabic, Persian and Latin.

Biography
Russo was born in Palermo, Sicily, the eighth of nine siblings.

As a child, singing was more important to Russo than playing or studying. She was often asked to perform at school.
Her teacher offered her own desk to Giuni to be used as a stage, but Giuni was so shy she preferred to perform while hiding behind the classroom door.
Her first public appearance was on a small stage actors from the Politeama Theatre in Palermo.

Without her family's knowledge, Russo took singing lessons from Master Ettore Gaiezza, paying him with the money earned from her local shows.

At age 15, she sang at the Castrocaro festival, reaching the semifinal. The following year she won the festival by unanimous vote, singing "Hurt" by Timi Yuro and "A chi" by Fausto Leali. The following year she competed in the Sanremo Festival under the name of Giusy Romeo, singing "No amore".

She released two singles during 1968, "No amore" and "L'onda". After her participation at Un Disco per l'Estate, Cantagiro and Festivalbar with the song "L'onda", she recorded the cover version of "Smoke in your eyes" and the cover of "I Say A Little Prayer" of Aretha Franklin in 1969. That year, she moved to Milan to collaborate with musician and songwriter Maria Antonietta Sisini.

1970s
In the 1970s, Russo began with several participations as chorist for many artist's publications. In 1972 she sang in the choirs of Balletto di Bronzo's Ys.

In 1974 she signed a contract for the German label "BASF", which gave her the pseudonym of Junie Russo. The following year her first LP, Love is a woman (sung in English) was released. In this period she also collaborated with Sisini as songwriter for other authors. Meanwhile, many singles were published such as "Everything is gonna be alright", a cover by PP Arnold. The last single recorded as Junie Russo, "Mai", was released in 1976 for the Durium.

In the meantime, Giuni and Maria Antonietta were appreciated as music composers for other artist's songs.

In 1978, she was renamed Giuni Russo and recorded a single for WEA (Italian arm of Warner Music Group), "Soli noi" (it), which became a surprise hit in France, leading to the French branch of RCA to offer her a recording contract, an offer she turned down when she decided to remain in Italy.

1980s
In 1979 she met the Sicilian singer-songwriter Franco Battiato, who produced her second LP, entitled Energie for the label CGD, released in 1981, containing the work of musicians such as Sisini, Franco Battiato, Giusto Pio, Alberto Radius and others.

In 1982 Giuni reached the peak of her popularity with the hit "Un'estate al mare", which went Gold Disc. She participated in the "Festivalbar", "Vota la voce", and many other events and broadcasts singing.

In 1983 she released the LP Vox, followed by her last work for that label LP Mediterranea (1984).

After divergences with the label's producer, Caterina Caselli, who wanted more commercial works, in 1986 she moved to label Ricordi, for which she released the LPs Giuni (1986), ALBUM (1987) and the more experimental A casa di Ida Rubinstein (1988), which featured influences of classical music.

Giuni and her life companion, Maria Antoinette Sisini, began to undergo a religious conversion and became practicing Catholics.  Many of her works subsequently developed a religious nature such as "La Sua Figura."  Giuni became  devoted to St. Ignatius of Loyola and especially St. Teresa of Ávila.

1990s
In the 1990s Russo devoted herself to World Music and music-theater.

In 1992, she released Amala, an album with sound of world-music, Arabic.

In 1994, she released a new album, Se fossi più simpatica sarei meno antipatica.

The title is inspired by Ettore Petrolini's monologue Fortunello. This album marked Russo's return to Emi, her first record company.

After two very much participations to the 'Premio Tenco' in 1994 with "Ciao amore", a cover by Luigi Tenco, and in 1995 with a minishow. In 1997 Russo published the single "Gabbiano", with the label ; a CD was supposed to follow but that never happened because of different point of view of the label manager.

Her first live album, Voce prigioniera, was released in 1998.

2000s
In 2002 she released the second live album, Signorina Romeo, by the Sony Music.
An emotional way through classic and unpublished songs, in which Giuni's spiritual research and the artistic and human evolution clearly emerge.

In 2003, after another and last participation to the Sanremo festival, with Morirò d'amore. Giuni released her last album, Morirò d'amore ("I Will Die of Love").
In this year she released, on 28 November, another new album Demo de midi.

In April 2004, she released a last new album Napoli che canta with DVD (a suite musical or soundtrack for the films "Napoli che canta").

Death

Russo died from cancer in her home in Milan on the night of 13 September 2004, at age 53.  She was buried in a section of the Cimitero Maggiore di Milano traditionally reserved for Carmelite nuns.

Legacy

The year following her death, Russo's immense repertory began to be published, starting with NAR, in 2005, of Mediterranea Tour, a 1984 concert, and the remixed and remastered A casa di Ida Rubinstein, which, in the meantime, became unobtainable on the market.
The DVD/CD is, like all the previous and following works, produced by Maria Antonietta Sisini and is the best selling product of all the charts, staying on the top for many weeks.

In 2005, after 25 years Energie is back to the charts, the only case of the kind, reprinted by Wea and including three bonus tracks: Un'estate al mare, Bing bang being and Adeste fideles.

In 2006 Giuni virtually duets with various national and international artists in Unusual, in which Giuni's voice sings with Caparezza, Lene Lovich, Franco Battiato, Toni Child and others, alternating original musical arrangement with brand new others.

In 2007 is the year of three publications: the whole remastered reprint Se fossi pi' simpatica sarei meno antipatica (1994), The complete Giuni, triple anthological CD, the only official one, and the DVD Docufilm La sua figura of Franco Battiato. Both works, immediately hit the charts.

In 2008 the album Cercati in me is released. It contains five previously unpublished and a fascinating ethnic-sounding mini-suites.

In 2009, he sees the light, the official biography, published by Bompiani Giuni Russo, da Un'estate al mare al Carmelo, written by Bianca Pitzorno, with the collaboration of Maria Antonietta Sisini, and a note by Franco Battiato. In addition to the book, the box contains the DVD/Docufilm "La sua figura" (2007) by Franco Battiato and a CD of six tracks unreleased demos.

In 2011 "A casa di Ida Rubinstein 2011", Cd+DVD, a new edition of the 1988's album with some great guests and a "jazz hint": Uri Caine, Brian Auger, Paolo Fresu.

In April 2012 the 1975's album Love is a woman is released on CD for the first time. The album, entirely sung in English, was recorded with the name "Junie Russo". Between the musician, Enrico Rava at the trumpet.

27 May 2012 The Gallery of the Zancanaro Theatre has been dedicated to Giuni Russo. On GiuniParaSiempre Fan Club's request, the City of Sacile, Friuli Venezia Giulia, was happy to pay tribute to Giuni, whom in 2003 gave her last concert in that Theatre.

In 2013, Pope Francis personally wrote to Maria Antoinetta Sisini, Giuni Russo's life companion, expressing his appreciation for the spiritual music of Giuni Russo.

Discography

As Giusy Romeo
Single
 1968 – No amore / Amerai Columbia/EMI (SCMQ 7082)
 1968 – L'onda / Lui e Lei Columbia/EMI (SCMQ 7095)
 1968 – I primi minuti / Fumo negli occhi Columbia/EMI (SCMQ 7118)

As Junie Russo
Single
 1975 – Milk of Paradise / I've Drunk in my Dream  BASF (06 13325-Q)
 1975 – Everything Is Gonna Be Alright / Vodka BASF (06 13330-Q)
 1975 – In trappola / Lui nell'anima GHIBLI (CD 4506)
 1976 – Mai / Che mi succede adesso DURIUM (Ld A 7950)

Albums
 1975 – Love is a woman BASF (21-23326 Q)

As Giuni Russo
Singles
 1978 – Soli noi / La chiave ELEKTRA (T 12290)
 1982 – Un'estate al mare / Bing bang being CGD (CGD 10401)
 1982 – Good Good Bye / Post moderno CGD (CGD 10437)
 1982 – Una Vipera Sarò / Tappeto Volante
 1983 – Good Good Bye / Un'estate al mare
 1984 – Mediterranea / Limonata cha cha cha CGD (CGD 10548)
 1986 – Alghero / Occhiali colorati BUBBLE/RICORDI (BLU 9233)
 1987 – Ragazzi al luna-park / Mango papaia BUBBLE/RICORDI (BLU 9238)
 1987 – Adrenalina / Adrenalina (remix strumental) BUBBLE/RICORDI (BLUX 934)
 1987 – Mango Papaia / Mango papaia (remix strumental) BUBBLE/RICORDI (BLUX ?)
 1990 – Un'estate al mare / Una vipera sarò (CGD 3984 23892-9)
 1994 – Se fossi più simpatica sarei meno antipatica
 1995 – Un'estate al mare (love guitar remix) / Un'estate al mare (deep mix) / Un'estate al mare (July 41 st) ITWHY (ITW 05)
 1997 – Gabbiano / Fonti mobili NAR (NAR 40132)
 2000 – Un'estate al mare (space mix) / Un'estate al mare (cub mix) / Un'estate al mare (dub version) HITLAND (EXTRA 05 CDs)
 2003 – Morirò d'amore / Il re del mondo (live)
 2006 – Un'estate al mare (remix feat. Megahertz) – PROMO
 2006 – Adrenalina (remix feat. MAB) – PROMO
 2006 – Una vipera sarò (remix feat. Caparezza) – PROMO

Albums
 1981 – Energie CGD (CGD 20269)
 1983 – Vox CGD (CGD 20360)
 1984 – Mediterranea CGD (CGD 20409)
 1986 – Giuni BUBBLE/RICORDI (BLULP 1822)
 1987 – Album BUBBLE/RICORDI (BLULP 1825)
 1988 – A casa di Ida Rubinstein L’OTTAVA/EMI (64 7915301)
 1992 – Amala CGD (4509-90011-2)
 1994 – Se fossi più simpatica sarei meno antipatica EMI (7243 8 29956 2 3)
 1998 – Voce prigioniera NAR (NAR 1349 2)
 2002 – Signorina Romeo Live
 2003 – Morirò d'Amore
 2003 – Demo De Midi
 2004 – Napoli che canta
 2006 – Unusual
 2008 – Cercati in me
 2011 – A casa di Ida Rubinstein 2011" Cd+ Dvd
 2012 – Love is a woman 2016 – Fonte d'amoreDVDs
 2004 – Napoli che canta 2005 – Mediterranea Tour (with CDs)
 2007 – La sua figuraCompilations
 1983 – Un'estate al mare 1987 – Sere d'agosto 1989 – I successi di Giuni Russo SPINNAKER/RICORDI (SPI13)
 1990 – Le più belle canzoni CGD musicA (9031 72212-2)
 1996 – Onde leggere TRING (TRI 028)
 1997 – La sposa FUEGO (PCD 2100)
 1999 – Alghero REPLAY MUSIC (RSCD 8032)
 2000 – Il meglio (rearranged tracks) MR MUSIC/D.V. MORE RECORD (MRCD 4198)
 2000 – I miei successi (rearranged tracks) D.V. MORE RECORD (CD DV 6411)
 2003 – Irradiazioni (unreleased tracks)
 2004 – Voce che grida 2007 – The Complete Giuni (with unreleased tracks and rearranged tracks)

Bibliography
 2009 – Bianca Pitzorno, Maria Antonietta Sisini. Giuni Russo, da Un'estate al mare al Carmelo (with DVD La sua figura'' and CD with tracks unreleased demos). Bompiani, 2009. .

References

External links
 www.giunirusso.it – Official Site
 www.giunirussostore.com – Giuni Russo Store

1951 births
2004 deaths
Musicians from Palermo
Italian women singer-songwriters
Italian pop singers
Deaths from cancer in Lombardy
20th-century Italian women singers